Kim Sung-bum (born July 29, 1978) is a South Korean actor, comedian, and traditional dancer. In 2005, Kim began his career as MBC comedian. Two years later Kim made his television debut with in MBC drama Chosun Cop Season 1 (2007) or also known as Byul Soon Geom. He has since starred in numerous television dramas, with the most recent one were Sell Your Haunted House (2021), Hometown Cha-Cha-Cha (2021) and Extraordinary Attorney Woo (2022).

Career

Acting career 
Kim is alumni of Department of Theatre of Seoul Institute of the Arts. He started his career in MBC as a comedian in 2005. In 2007, he made his television debut with minor role in MBC drama Chosun Cop Season 1 (2007). While still working as comedian, in 2008 he worked as actor in different fields, from stage play The Crucible (2008), stage musical Pippin (2008) and movie Story of Wine (2008).

Since Kim met Park Bo-young in movie Hot Young Bloods (2014), he starred in several of her projects, such as three tvN dramas Oh My Ghost (2015), Strong Girl Bong-soon (2017) and Abyss (2019), also in her film On Your Wedding Day (2018). Before Park Bo-young moved to her current agency, She and Kim were together in same Actor Management Agency Fidespartium.

In 2015, Kim got his first television supporting role in director Yoo Je-won's drama Oh My Ghost as a police officer Han Jin-goo. He worked again with director Yoo Je-won in drama Abyss (2019) and Hometown Cha-Cha-Cha (2021).

Traditional dancer career 
Beside being an actor, Kim is a traditional Korean dancer called Goseong Ogwangdae for more than a decades. He is part of Goseong Ogwangdae Preservation Society lead by Lee Yoon-seok. His status is graduate member.

In 2015, he performed in Korean Master Singers Workshop in Northern California. It was hosted by the Korean Cultural Center with special support from the Goseong Ogwangdae Conservation Association, the 7th Important Intangible Cultural Heritage. Kim and fellow dancer Yoon Hyun-ho teach at Workshop on September 19th and 21st, 2015 at the Silicon Valley Korean Hall. On September 25, 2015 a workshop was held at Doherty Valley High School located in San Ramon, California. On September 26, Kim as Goseong Ohgwangdae mask dance instructors performed the dance at Silicon Valley Korean Sschool.

His most notable project as dancer was in National Theater Company’s Project Yeongeuk-dongne Yeonhui Madang (2018).The concept was “rediscovery of the original Korean theater project in an effort to find the identity of Korean theater in our time: a look at representative traditional performances with theatricality”. It was held as an exciting one-day festival at the Seogye-dong Madang of the National Theater Company. It unfolds into three courtyards where you can examine the originality of Korean theater and the possibility of modernization. Kim performed in the second courtyard, where creative performances, 'Finding the Yangban', a modern re-creation of the elements of the mask dance 'Goseong Ogwangdae', was presented as a showcase. He was part of a large number of theater actors selected by audition participate in the work, demonstrating the unique excitement of mask dance.

Since 2019, Kim also involved in 'BBRUN' Project, the first metaverse experience performance in Korea. A new theatrical performance that combines motion capture technology and virtual experience technology. The first performance were hosted by Gwangju Asian Culture Center (ACC) and Asian Cultural Center (ACI), on the 20th until the 22nd November 2020, and was held on the stage of the Cultural Creation Center ACT Studio.

Filmography

Film

Television

Television drama

Television comedy show

Performance

References

External links 

 
Kim Sung-bum at Daum Encyclopedia 
Kim Sung-bum at Movie Daum 
Kim Sung-bum at Naver 

Living people
1978 births
21st-century South Korean male actors
South Korean male actors
South Korean male film actors
South Korean male stage actors
South Korean male television actors
Seoul Institute of the Arts alumni